is a Japanese male curler from Sapporo.

At the national level, he is a 2018 Japan men's champion curler.

Teams

References

External links

Ryotaro Shukuya - Curling World Cup
Video: 

Living people
1995 births
People from Hokkaido
Japanese male curlers

Japanese curling champions
21st-century Japanese people